Philippe Bradshaw was a British artist. Born in 1965 in Uppingham in Rutland, he grew up in Stamford, Lincolnshire, and attended Stamford School. He died on 25 August 2005 in Paris, France,.

Bradshaw graduated from Goldsmiths College in 1988 alongside several of the artists who were to participate in the YBA scene of art.

Bradshaw made many works using chainlink tapestries, made link by link, within whole room installations. Bradshaw lived his work and was considered eccentric even amongst his peers. Bradshaw was awarded a Hamlyn Award in 2000. In 2001, Bradshaw featured in a BBC documentary The New East Enders alongside Tim Noble and Sue Webster.

Between 1993 and 1999, Bradshaw collaborated with Andrea Mason making work as 'Andrea + Philippe'.

References

Publications

 Philippe Bradshaw: A Fly in the House, Pub. Hatje Kantz, 2005.
 Norman Rosenthal, Max Wigram, Sex and the British, Éd. Thaddaeus Ropac, Paris, 2000
 Philippe Bradshaw, Éd. Thaddaeus Ropac, Paris, 2001.

1965 births
2005 deaths
People from Stamford, Lincolnshire
English installation artists
Alumni of Goldsmiths, University of London
People educated at Stamford School